Parayamparanbil Kuttappan Biju (born 3 April 1974) is an Indian politician. He is a former member of the Indian Parliament in the 15th and 16th Lok Sabha of India, and represented Alathur (Lok Sabha constituency) till May 2019. He lost in the general elections to the 17th Lok Sabha.

Political career 
P. K. Biju was the former All India President of Students' Federation of India and President Kerala State Committee. He was the President of Kottayam SFI District committee in Kerala.

He is currently the Kerala state secretariate committee member of the Communist Party of India (Marxist).

References

External links

1974 births
Living people
India MPs 2009–2014
Communist Party of India (Marxist) politicians from Kerala
India MPs 2014–2019
Lok Sabha members from Kerala
Politicians from Kottayam
Students' Federation of India All India Presidents